Kendi Island is an islet in Southwest Penang Island District, Penang, Malaysia, located off the southern coast of Penang Island. The terrain of much of the islet's shoreline is relatively jagged, except for a few narrow beaches.

See also
 List of islands of Malaysia

References 

Islands of Penang
Southwest Penang Island District